Kalabakan is a town and the capital of Kalabakan District, Sabah, Malaysia. It is located in the Tawau Division, and is about 55 kilometres west of the town of Tawau.

References 

Kalabakan District
Populated places in Sabah